The Frio River is a river in the U.S. state of Texas.  The word frío is Spanish for cold, a clear reference to the spring-fed coolness of the river.

Variant names
According to the Geographic Names Information System, it has also been known historically as:
Rio Frio
Arroyo Hondo
Rio Hondo
Rio Sarco

Geography
The Frio River has three primary tributaries; the East, West, and Dry Frio Rivers.  The West Frio River rises from springs in northeastern Real County and joins with the East Frio River near the town of Leakey; the Dry Frio River joins northeast of Uvalde. The river flows generally southeast for 200 miles until it empties into the Nueces River south of the town of Three Rivers. Along the way, the Frio River provides water to the Choke Canyon Reservoir in McMullen and Live Oak Counties.

Recreation
The cool and consistent flow of the Frio River has made it a popular summertime destination. Numerous other privately owned campgrounds are also found along the river.

Miscellaneous
 Frio County, Texas is named for the river.
From that latter place, the Frio River's water volume in summer months is insufficient to surmount the natural percolation down into limestone subsurface water courses; therefore, the river bed appears dry intermittently, and the river is no longer efficiently navigable continuously year-round from that place to its confluence with the Nueces River. Applicable laws concerning navigability include statutes written in Spanish that are still in force in Texas. The river may only be accessed from public access points, and all river banks are private property. Accessing the riverbanks is only legal in the event of portaging canoes or scouting for obstructions. As stated by the Texas Parks and Wildlife Department, which manages navigable rivers in Texas: "Senate Bill (S.B.) 155 strikes a balance between the navigation right and private property interests by providing that portaging or scouting obstructions do not create a prescriptive easement over any private property so used. Thus, under S.B. 155, if private riverside property is used to portage or scout obstructions, the landowner does not bear any risk of permanent loss of a property interest. Should it become unnecessary to use that particular riverside property to portage or scout obstructions (for example, because the river changes course), the public right of use disappears."

Gallery

See also
List of rivers of Texas

References

External links
 
 

Rivers of Texas
Tributaries of the Nueces River
Bodies of water of Live Oak County, Texas
Bodies of water of Real County, Texas
Bodies of water of McMullen County, Texas
Rivers of Uvalde County, Texas
Bodies of water of Frio County, Texas
Bodies of water of La Salle County, Texas
San Antonio–El Paso Road